Carreiro may refer to:

People
Carreiro (footballer), João Baptista Siqueira Lima, Brazilian football midfielder
Dylan Carreiro (born 1995), Canadian soccer player
Júnior Carreiro (born 1991), Brazilian footballer

Other
Carreiro River (Rio Carreiro), a river in the state of Santa Catarina, Brazil